The 1881–82 season was the 11th season of competitive football in England.

National team
England played Ireland for the first time. Their 13–0 victory is still the team's largest ever win.

* England score given first

† This match constituted Ireland's international debut

Key
 H = Home match
 A = Away match
 F = Friendly

Honours

Notes = Number in parentheses is the times that club has won that honour. * indicates new record for competition

References

External links

Report on Scotland v England match on thefa.com